The Engine House No. 3 in Sandusky, Ohio, at Meigs St. and Sycamore Line, was built in 1894.  It was listed on the National Register of Historic Places in 1975.

It is built of cut limestone and has entrances which are "basically Richardsonian Romanesque in style, with some classical elements."

See also 
 National Register of Historic Places listings in Erie County, Ohio
 Engine House No. 1 (Sandusky, Ohio)
 No. 5 Fire Station (Sandusky, Ohio)

References

Fire stations on the National Register of Historic Places in Ohio
National Register of Historic Places in Erie County, Ohio
Fire stations completed in 1894
Richardsonian Romanesque architecture in Ohio
1894 establishments in Ohio
Buildings and structures in Sandusky, Ohio